The Avion My Uncle Flew is a children's novel by Cyrus Fisher, a pseudonym of Darwin Teilhet. The plot concerns an American boy who uncovers a mystery while visiting his uncle in post-war France. The novel was first published in 1946 and was a Newbery Honor recipient in 1947.

References

American children's novels
Novels set in France
Newbery Honor-winning works
1946 American novels
Children's mystery novels
Aviation novels
1946 children's books